Vist is a defunct railway station located on the Nordland Line located in the village of Vist in Steinkjer municipality, Trøndelag county, Norway. The station building was razed in 1965 and the station closed for traffic in 1990. The station did not have a residential section and was drawn by Paul Armin Due.

History
The station was built as part of Hell–Sunnan Line and opened 15 November 1905 along with the rest of the line north of Verdal. Though part of the initial plans for the railway, and supported by the then Sparbu municipal council, the Parliament decided not to build the station on 5 June 1900 but changed their minds giving the go-ahead on 24 April 1901.

References

Railway stations in Steinkjer
Railway stations on the Nordland Line
Railway stations opened in 1905
Railway stations closed in 1990
Disused railway stations in Norway
1905 establishments in Norway
1990 disestablishments in Norway
National Romantic architecture in Norway
Art Nouveau railway stations